James Steward Bodden (born 9 December 1946) is a Honduran football goalkeeper who played for Honduras in the 1982 FIFA World Cup.

Club career
Steward started his career at Platense and then left them citing bad eyesight only to sign for Real España.

International career
He has represented his country in 5 FIFA World Cup qualification matches, being part of the team during the qualifiers in Haiti in 1973.

References

External links

1946 births
Living people
Association football goalkeepers
Honduran footballers
Honduras international footballers
1982 FIFA World Cup players
Platense F.C. players
Real C.D. España players
C.D. Marathón players